Philippscelus is a genus of beetles in the family Buprestidae, containing the following species:

 Philippscelus fisheri (Hoscheck, 1931)
 Philippscelus gracilis Bellamy & Ohmomo, 2009
 Philippscelus panayensis Bellamy, 2005

References

Buprestidae genera